Peter Babcock is a former NBA executive, serving as general manager with three franchises; the San Diego Clippers, Denver Nuggets and Atlanta Hawks. He also worked in a variety of capacities from scouting to coaching to player personnel with the New Orleans Jazz, Los Angeles Lakers, Milwaukee Bucks, Toronto Raptors and Cleveland Cavaliers over a 42-year period.  He also served as president and minority owner in his final two seasons with the Denver Nuggets. His Nuggets and Hawks teams appeared in the playoffs 14 out of 15 seasons.  Babcock also directed the NBA Pre Draft Camp for over twenty years, served on the competition and rules committee and steering committee for the NBA and was a member of the USA basketball men's selection committee picking the 1996 Olympic team and head coach.

Career

Denver Nuggets 
Babcock was employed by the Denver Nuggets from 1984 to 1990. While Babcock was in Denver, the team made the playoffs six out of six years, winning two division championships and going to the Western Conference Finals in 1985.
During his time in Denver, he initiated the "Fast Break for Life Tour" which involved annual visits to Native American reservations throughout the country to work with young people.  He continued that program for the next 15 years when he joined the Atlanta Hawks.  Babcock and Alex English were honored in a Rose Garden ceremony by President Ronald Reagan for this work.  Babcock testified in Congress in 1988 to push for increased funding for research dealing with substance abuse among the country's youth.

Atlanta Hawks 
In Atlanta, from 1990–1993, he rebuilt the team while making the playoffs two of those three seasons and resulted in finishing the 1993-94 season with the best record in the Eastern Conference and the division championship. He added Mookie Blaylock, Steve Smith, Dikembe Mutombo, Craig Ehlo, Grant Long, Christian Laettner as well as hiring Hall of Fame coach Lenny Wilkens, and the team went on a six-year run of averaging 50 plus wins per season.

Babcock initiated a "Life Experience Program" to enhance players exposure to life outside of the game.  Players visited a diversity of sites including Ford's Theater in Washington DC, NORAD in Colorado Springs, the Black Cowboy Museum in Denver, Ground Zero in NYC just months following 9/11, and the Pentagon to name a few.  They also met with a variety of speakers such as John Lewis, John Wooden, Andrew Young and others.  The effort was to broaden the horizons of professional athletes off the court.  For his efforts, he was recognized as Sports Personality of the Year by Georgia Special Olympics, received the Golden Apple Award from the Atlanta Public Schools and the prestigious Phoenix Award from the Mayor of Atlanta.

The Hawks finished the lockout season of 1999 only two games off the best record in the East and lost to the New York Knicks in the second round. The team decided to rebuild again following that season, and traded away Steve Smith for Isaiah Rider and Dikembe Mutombo for Theo Ratliff, Nazr Mohammed, Toni Kukoč and Pepe Sanchez. The Hawks were not successful during the next few years, and Babcock was fired in April 2003. Babcock's teams were built through trades and free agency with draft picks as role players as they normally drafted later in the first round.

Toronto Raptors 
After leaving the Hawks, Babcock was hired by the Toronto Raptors, joining his brother Rob Babcock, then the general manager. Babcock left after two years.

Cleveland Cavaliers 
In 2007, Babcock was hired by the Cleveland Cavaliers to be a scout and he served in that capacity for ten years finishing with an NBA championship in 2016 and retiring. During his time with the Cavs, he was recognized by the National Cystic Fibrosis Foundation in Washington DC, with the annual Hitchcock Humanitarian Award, for his community service over his NBA career.  He currently teaches as an adjunct professor at Emory University in Atlanta.

References

External links
Official website

Living people
Atlanta Hawks executives
Toronto Raptors executives
Year of birth missing (living people)